is a Japanese politician of the Democratic Party of Japan, a member of the House of Councillors in the Diet (national legislature). A native of Tokyo and graduate of the University of Tokyo, he was elected to the House of Representatives for the first time in 2003 after an unsuccessful run in 2000. After losing the seat in 2005, he was elected to the House of Councillors for the first time in 2007.

References

External links 
 

Members of the House of Representatives (Japan)
Members of the House of Councillors (Japan)
20th-century Japanese lawyers
University of Tokyo alumni
1951 births
Living people
Democratic Party of Japan politicians
Politicians from Tokyo
21st-century Japanese politicians